Richard Alfred Marquand (22 September 1937 – 4 September 1987) was a British film and television director active in both US and UK film productions, best known for directing the 1983 space opera Return of the Jedi, the final film in the original Star Wars trilogy. He also directed the critically acclaimed 1981 drama film Eye of the Needle, the quiet Paris set romance Until September, and the hit 1985 thriller Jagged Edge.

Early life
Marquand was born in Llanishen, Cardiff, Wales. He was the son of Rachel E. (née Rees) and Hilary Marquand, an economist and Labour MP who served as Minister of Pensions and later Minister of Health under Prime Minister Clement Attlee. He is the younger brother of David Marquand, who also served as a Labour MP.

Marquand was educated at Emanuel School, London, the University of Aix-Marseille in France and King's College, Cambridge, where he read modern languages, and where one of his tutors was E. M. Forster. During National Service he studied Mandarin and was posted to Hong Kong where he also read the news on the English language Hong Kong Television.

Career
By the late 1960s, Marquand had begun a career directing television documentaries for the BBC, where he worked on projects such as the 1972 series Search for the Nile and an edition of One Pair of Eyes (1968), about the novelist Margaret Drabble who had been a friend of his at Cambridge. He collaborated with the celebrated foreign correspondent James Cameron on a long-running series called Cameron Country for BBC television and also with John Pilger on a series of films for ITV. In 1979, Marquand incorporated many of his documentary techniques in his biographical television movie Birth of the Beatles.  He directed several films specifically for children including the 1977 Emmy winning Big Henry and the Polka Dot Kid.

On the strength of his direction of the 1981 feature, Eye of the Needle, Marquand was hired by writer-producer George Lucas to direct Return of the Jedi. In his commentary track on the DVD, Lucas explains that Marquand "had done some great suspense films and was really good with actors. Eye of the Needle was the film I'd seen that he had done that impressed me the most, it was really nicely done and had a lot of energy and suspense." For his work on the film, Marquand won a Hugo Award for Best Dramatic Presentation in 1984.

Marquand subsequently directed the 1985 courtroom thriller Jagged Edge, starring Jeff Bridges and Glenn Close.

Personal life and death
In 1960, Marquand married screenwriter Josephine Elwyn-Jones, the daughter of Labour MP Elwyn Jones and author and illustrator Pearl Binder. They had two children, Hannah Rachel and James Elwyn, before they divorced in 1970. James Marquand is a film editor who has also worked as a director. In 1981, Marquand married fellow film director Carol Bell, with whom he had another two children, Sam Adair and Molly Joyce. Marquand was a fan of Liverpool Football Club.

According to a 2014 Wales Online interview with his son James, Marquand wrote a screenplay for "a Welsh western" in the late 1970s at the South Wales branch of Pinewood Studios. The screenplay told the story of a young orphan girl in Victorian Mid Wales who enlists two local men to help her wreak revenge on those who killed her father; Marquand used to tell the story to his children when they were on holiday at the family's cottage near Tregaron. Marquand reportedly pitched it to Hollywood producers who expressed interest in making it into a film; however, Marquand declined the offer because the producers insisted the story be relocated to the Rocky Mountains in the United States. In the interview, James Marquand expressed interest in adapting his father's screenplay into a film.

Marquand was driving his children home when he suffered a stroke brought on by an embolism. He reached the destination before collapsing and died in hospital in Tunbridge Wells, Kent, on 4 September 1987 at the age of 49. His last film, Hearts of Fire, starring Bob Dylan, was released posthumously.

Filmography

Theatrical feature films

Short films

Television films

Television series

References

External links

 
 

1937 births
1987 deaths
Alumni of King's College, Cambridge
Mass media people from Cardiff
Welsh film directors
Hugo Award winners
People educated at Emanuel School
Burials at Forest Lawn Memorial Park (Hollywood Hills)
Science fiction film directors
Return of the Jedi
Aix-Marseille University alumni
British documentary filmmakers
Deaths from embolism
Welsh television directors